The smiting-blade symbol (hieroglyph), a "horizontal blade-shape", is a symbol in Gardiner's sign list as no. Aa7, in the unclassified category. The symbol can be found in use from the First Dynasty of Egypt, for example on the MacGregor Label, one of Pharaoh Den's twenty labels (tags) found in his tomb. It is also seen on an artifact belonging to Queen Qaineit, possibly one of King Den's wives.

In the Egyptian language, the "smiting-blade symbol" has the value of sḳr (sqr). It follows the same usage of the symbol under seq, for "to smite, strike". The meaning of sqr has meanings listed as: "to beat, strike, fight, and capture prisoners".

See also
Gardiner's Sign List#Aa. Unclassified
List of Egyptian hieroglyphs

References

Budge, 1920, (1978). An Egyptian Hieroglyphic Dictionary, E.A.Wallace Budge, (Dover Publications), c 1978, (c 1920), Dover edition, 1978. (In two volumes, 1314 pp. and cliv-(154) pp.) (softcover)
Schulz, Seidel, 1998. Egypt: The World of the Pharaohs, Editors, Regine Schulz, Matthias Seidel, Könemann Verlagsgesellschaft mbH, Cologne, English translation version. (hardcover)

External links 

Egyptian hieroglyphs: unclassified